Jackman is a surname and rarely, a given name. Notable people with the surname include:

Barret Jackman, Canadian ice hockey player
Bernard Jackman, Irish rugby player
Clyde Jackman, Canadian politician
Danny Jackman, English footballer
David Jackman (musician), British artist
David Jackman (minister), English minister
Galen B. Jackman, Retired United States Army Major General
Henry N.R. "Hal" Jackman, Canadian politician and former Lieutenant Governor of Ontario
Henry R. "Harry" Jackman, Canadian politician and entrepreneur (Empire Life Insurance Co.)
Herbert Louis Jackman  (1867–1936), Australian architect, in practice with Daniel Garlick as Garlick & Jackman (and variations) in Adelaide
Herbert Montefiore Jackman (1897–1968), Australian architect, in practice with George Soward as English, Soward & Jackman in Adelaide
Herbert Louis Jackman, early South Australian architect who worked with Daniel Garlick
Hugh Jackman, Australian actor
Joseph Jackman (1844–1914), founder of Jackman's Rooms in Adelaide, South Australia
Jermain Jackman, singer
Lois Jackman (born 1937), Australian discus thrower
Maia Jackman, New Zealand footballer
Marion Jackman, Australian squash player
Mary Jackman, Irish politician
Myles Jackman, British lawyer
Pål Jackman, Norwegian director
Ric Jackman (born 1978), Canadian ice hockey defenceman
Robert Jackman, also known as  Ajahn Sumedho  prominent Theravada  bhikkhu 
Robin Jackman, English cricketer
Tim Jackman, American ice hockey player

Given name
Notable people with the given name include:
 Jackman "Jack" Harlow (born 1998), American rapper
Jackman Stewart (1930-2000), American teacher, coach, and school administrator at the Berkshire School in Sheffield, Massachusetts

See also
Jackman, Maine, town in Somerset County, Maine, United States